Waitahanui is a village in the Taupō District, Waikato region, New Zealand.

Waitahanui Marae and Pākira meeting house is a meeting place for the Ngāti Tūwharetoa hapū of Ngāti Hinerau and Ngāti Tutemohuta. The Waitahanui Bridge site is also a meeting place for the Ngāti Tūwharetoa hapū.

Demographics
The settlement is part of the larger Waitahanui statistical area.

Five Mile Bay-Waitahanui had a population of 555 at the 2018 New Zealand census, an increase of 141 people (34.1%) since the 2013 census, and an increase of 102 people (22.5%) since the 2006 census. There were 177 households, comprising 267 males and 282 females, giving a sex ratio of 0.95 males per female, with 108 people (19.5%) aged under 15 years, 87 (15.7%) aged 15 to 29, 240 (43.2%) aged 30 to 64, and 108 (19.5%) aged 65 or older.

Ethnicities were 43.2% European/Pākehā, 64.3% Māori, 3.8% Pacific peoples, and 2.2% Asian. People may identify with more than one ethnicity.

Although some people chose not to answer the census's question about religious affiliation, 33.5% had no religion, 27.0% were Christian, 32.4% had Māori religious beliefs, 0.5% were Buddhist and 2.2% had other religions.

Of those at least 15 years old, 45 (10.1%) people had a bachelor's or higher degree, and 87 (19.5%) people had no formal qualifications. 48 people (10.7%) earned over $70,000 compared to 17.2% nationally. The employment status of those at least 15 was that 192 (43.0%) people were employed full-time, 66 (14.8%) were part-time, and 27 (6.0%) were unemployed.

Waitahanui statistical area

Waitahanui had a population of 795 at the 2018 New Zealand census, an increase of 153 people (23.8%) since the 2013 census, and an increase of 105 people (15.2%) since the 2006 census. There were 258 households, comprising 393 males and 399 females, giving a sex ratio of 0.98 males per female. The median age was 41.8 years (compared with 37.4 years nationally), with 165 people (20.8%) aged under 15 years, 129 (16.2%) aged 15 to 29, 363 (45.7%) aged 30 to 64, and 135 (17.0%) aged 65 or older.

Ethnicities were 58.9% European/Pākehā, 50.6% Māori, 3.4% Pacific peoples, 1.1% Asian, and 0.4% other ethnicities. People may identify with more than one ethnicity.

The percentage of people born overseas was 7.9, compared with 27.1% nationally.

Although some people chose not to answer the census's question about religious affiliation, 39.6% had no religion, 29.4% were Christian, 24.2% had Māori religious beliefs, 0.4% were Hindu, 0.4% were Muslim, 0.4% were Buddhist and 1.9% had other religions.

Of those at least 15 years old, 75 (11.9%) people had a bachelor's or higher degree, and 129 (20.5%) people had no formal qualifications. The median income was $27,100, compared with $31,800 nationally. 78 people (12.4%) earned over $70,000 compared to 17.2% nationally. The employment status of those at least 15 was that 297 (47.1%) people were employed full-time, 102 (16.2%) were part-time, and 33 (5.2%) were unemployed.

Education

References

Taupō District
Populated places in Waikato
Populated places on Lake Taupō